IHT Records (stylised as iht Records) is a British record label, founded and owned by David Gray.  His 1999 album White Ladder was released on the label.

References

British record labels
Vanity record labels
David Gray (musician)